Superdragon may refer to:
SuperDragons, a public art project in Newport, Wales
Cray CS6400 computer, codenamed "SuperDragon"
Bruce Lee: A Dragon Story, a biopic also known as Superdragon
Secret Agent Super Dragon, a 1966 Eurospy film
Super Dragon, American professional wrestler
Super-Dragon, a variant of the M47 Dragon anti-tank missile
Elizalde Super-Dragon, an aircraft engine